Hagiwara is a Japanese surname. Notable people with the surname include:

 (also known as Sho-Ken), the lead singer of The Tempters
, Japanese pop singer
, San Francisco landscape designer often credited with inventing the fortune cookie
, Japanese actor
, Japanese women's basketball player
, Japanese actor
, Japanese writer
 (also known as Kisenosato or Nishonoseki), 72nd yokozuna of professional sumo

See also
 Hagiwara Solutions, Japanese manufacturer of solid state mass-storage devices
 Hagiwara Station (disambiguation), multiple railway stations in Japan

Japanese-language surnames